Second Pinarayi Vijayan Ministry is the Council of Ministers headed by Pinarayi Vijayan that was formed after winning in the 15th legislative assembly elections by bagging 99 of the 140 seats in the Assembly. The Council assumed office on 20 May 2021. The ministry is having a total of 21 ministers in the Cabinet compared to 20 ministers in the previous government.

Council of Ministers

Chair & Chief Whip

Former cabinet members

Swearing Ceremony 

Pinarayi Vijayan Ministry took oath at the Central Stadium in Thiruvananthapuram on 20 May 2021 Thursday at  3:30 IST. The new Kerala state cabinet have 21 members including the chief minister. This time, the ruling Left Democratic Front had decided to replace all sitting ministers. Before taking oath, all CPI(M) ministers offered prayers at the Martyrs Column in Alappuzha. The swearing ceremony took place in strict adherence to Covid-19 protocol. Around 350 people attended the ceremony.

Controversies 

 The Pinarayi Vijayan government’s decision to hold a swearing-in ceremony though under strict social distancing norms were criticed by IMA . The Kerala chapter of the Indian Medical Association had earlier urged the government to organise the swearing-in ceremony virtually. 
 Former health minister K. K. Shailaja, who tenured during the Covid-19 crisis, is not a part of the new state cabinet, which is set to have freshers from CPI(M) and CPI, with CM Pinarayi Vijayan being the exception. Shailaja garnered public attention after her involvement in containing the spread of COVID-19 in the initial phase of the pandemic in the state. She had previously worked on the containment of the Nipah virus in Kerala as well, in 2018 and 2019. Shailaja has received awards for her prompt action in tracking, isolation, and containment of the spread of the COVID-19. Many have taken to social media to express their displeasure over the exclusion of Shailaja from the cabinet. They opined that the role played by her in the victory of LDF was commendable.

See also 

 List of Kerala ministers
 Chief Ministers of Kerala
 History of Kerala
 List of current Indian chief ministers
 Pinarayi Vijayan
 First Pinarayi Vijayan Ministry

References 

Kerala ministries
2021 in Indian politics
Communist Party of India (Marxist) state ministries
Communist Party of India
Nationalist Congress Party
Janata Dal (Secular) ministries
2021 establishments in Kerala
Cabinets established in 2021